Walking wounded is a medical classification for persons who are not so badly injured that they cannot walk. 

Walking wounded may also refer to:

Music
Walking Wounded, a 1996 album and eponymous single by Everything but the Girl
The Walking Wounded, an album by Bayside

Songs
"Walking Wounded", song from Everything but the Girl album Walking Wounded
"Walking Wounded" (song), promotional single by The Tea Party
"Walking Wounded", song from Page 44 album A Slice of Fried Gold

Other uses
Walking Wounded (short story collection), a collection of short stories by Scottish writer William McIlvanney